The 2022 São Tomé and Príncipe coup d'état attempt was an attempted coup d'état that is reported to have taken place on the island nation of São Tomé and Príncipe overnight on 24–25 November 2022. 

At a press conference held on 25 November, the nation's prime minister, Patrice Trovoada, said that the country's armed forces headquarters had come under attack from four men, including Delfim Neves, president of the outgoing National Assembly, and a military officer who had attempted a previous coup. The attempted coup was thwarted by the government, and its perpetrators were described as being under arrest.

Four people were killed in a gunfight, and 12 active soldiers were involved. Trovoada also suggested fighters from the officially disbanded South African group Buffalo Battalion were involved, and that one of their mercenaries Arlecio Costa, who was killed in the fighting, was one of the ringleaders.

The coup leaders said they had tried to overthrow the government due to poverty in the country.

In a Deutsche Welle interview on 6 December, outgoing prime minister Jorge Bom Jesus labelled the event as an "invention" that the new government would use as a pretext to crack down on opposition parties.

See also
History of São Tomé and Príncipe
1995 São Tomé and Príncipe coup d'état attempt
2003 São Tomé and Príncipe coup d'état attempt

References

2020s coups d'état and coup attempts
Conflicts in 2022
History of São Tomé and Príncipe
Attempted coups d'état in São Tomé and Príncipe
November 2022 events in Africa
2022 in São Tomé and Príncipe